São Raimundo Esporte Clube, or São Raimundo, as they are usually called, is a Brazilian football team from Santarém in Pará, founded on 9 January 1944.

São Raimundo is currently ranked fourth among Pará teams in CBF's national club ranking, at 120th place overall.

History
On January 3, 1944, a committee formed by David Nathanael Valdomiro Pinto and Gerson Marino went to the house of Odorico Reis de Almeida and invited him to assume the presidency of the club, for which he already showed their sympathy publicly. The invitation was accepted and soon marked the meeting of presentation and possession.

On 6 January, the house of Odorico Almeida himself was the meeting where the new board was chosen and sworn, with Odorico Reis Almeida as President and maintenance of other associates in positions for which they were elected previously. Valdomiro Paz Pinto as Secretary, Gerson Marinho da Silva as Treasurer and David Nathanael Barbosa dos Santos as Director of Sports. After the act of inauguration, the new president immediately decided on the purchase of a book of minutes, as well as the official foundation of São Raimundo, scoring for the following Sunday the solemn event.

Thus on January 9, 1944, Sunday, at a General Meeting held on Joy Street was officially founded the São Raimundo Esporte Clube, with the members of his board first masters: Odorico Reis de Almeida (President), Adamor Bibiano Ribeiro Macedo (First Secretary), Roosevelt de Pinho Gonçalves (Second Secretary), Francisco Carlos Pereira (First Treasurer), Valdomiro Pinto (Deputy Treasurer), and David Natanael Barbosa dos Santos (Director of Sports). Gifts to the electoral event, in addition to the elected board, among others, Ray Jennings, Valdo Marino, Miró, Gerson Marinho, Orlando Cota, Nego Otávio, Valentim, André Pimenta, Água Preta, Osmar Cota, Pé de Chumbo, Domingos Tapioca, Noronha, Dedé, Pingo, Perpétuo and Cassete.

In 2009, the club made history by winning the Campeonato Brasileiro Série D.

Stadium

São Raimundo play their home games at Estádio Municipal Colosso do Tapajós. The stadium has a maximum capacity of 17,846 people.

Rivalries
São Raimundo's biggest rival is São Francisco.

Honours
 Campeonato Brasileiro Série D
 Winners (1): 2009

References

External links
 Official Site

Association football clubs established in 1944
São Raimundo
1944 establishments in Brazil
Campeonato Brasileiro Série D winners